Lennox Mauris (born 20 January 1977) is an international footballer from the former Netherlands Antilles. He has played club football in Belgium for K Bocholter VV and in the Netherlands for Türkiyemspor and Haaglandia.

External links

Caribbean Football Database
 

1977 births
Living people
Dutch Antillean footballers
Netherlands Antilles international footballers
Haaglandia players
FC Türkiyemspor players

Association football defenders